Khan Bahadur Allah Bakhsh Gabol (15 August 1895 – December 1972) was a political leader of the 20th century and an exponent of the Pakistan Movement from Sindh . He owned a considerable portion of land in Karachi, including the area of Lea Market and the stretch of land where Safoora Goth, Abdullah Gabol Goth, Chutta Khan Goth and Gadap now exist. He also possessed the land where Gabol Town and Jinnah International Airport are now located. Allah Bakhsh Gabol was the son of a landlord Khudadad Khan Gabol, and the grandfather of Sardar Nabil Ahmed Gabol, who is a notable politician and nawab of Gabol tribe.

Political life 
Gabol was the first Deputy Speaker of the Sindh Assembly, after the imposition of Government of India Act 1935 . He defeated Haji Sir Abdullah Haroon in 1937 in the first election after Sindh was separated from Bombay. He was also twice elected the Mayor of the then Karachi Municipal Corporation in 1951 and 1961. It is now the Karachi Metropolitan Corporation. . Due to his outstanding status, he was awarded the title of Khan Bahadur by the British Empire and after the independence of Pakistan in 1947, he was awarded the Sitara i Imtiaz by President Ayub Khan in 1966. Thus he was considered to be an influential politician of Karachi of his times.

Baloch League
Karachi is not only the cradle of the modern Balochi literary movement, but also the centre to uphold the modern Baloch political trends. Simultaneous with formation of the Anjuman, the Baloch literary class in Karachi formed a nationalist organisation, called the Baloch League. Gholam Mohammad Noor ud-Din, educated from Bombay, was appointed its president. The other members of its leadership were: Waja Umar Bux Subra Khan, a famous merchant, Maolavi Mohammad Osman, Mehrab Khan, Issa Khan, Maolavi Abdul Samad Sarbazi, Khan Sahib Osman, Pir Bakhsh Shahdad and Gabol. In its annual conference in 1930 the League condemned Magasi's imprisonment and openly demanded his immediate release from the British authorities. In the late 1930s, after his graduation from Aligarh University, the nationalist leader, Ghaus Bakhsh Bizenjo also joined the League.

References

External links
Provincial Assembly of Sindh
BalochNationalismitsOriginandDevelopment.pdf
https://web.archive.org/web/20080322062006/http://www.albloushi.net/baloosh/baloosh4.htm
http://www.ansab-online.com/phpBB2/archive/index.php?t-1824.html
Sindh Government website

|-

1895 births
1972 deaths
Tumandars
Baloch people
Pakistani landowners
Pakistan Movement activists
Mayors of Karachi
Members of the Provincial Assembly of Sindh
Politicians from Karachi
20th-century landowners